The Conquest may refer to:

 The Norman conquest of England in 1066
 The Spanish Conquest of the Aztec Empire in 1519
 The Conquest of 1760, where England acquired parts of New France during the French and Indian War or Seven Years' War
 The Conquest (1996 film), a Hungarian film
 The Conquest (TV series), a Chinese historical drama that aired in 2006 and 2007
 The Conquest (2011 film), a French film